Robert Hunt (born August 25, 1996) is an American football guard for the Miami Dolphins of the National Football League (NFL). He played college football at Louisiana.

Early life and high school
Hunt was born in Wiergate, Texas before moving with his family to Fort Worth, Texas at a young age. His family moved back to the Wiergate area briefly before evacuating to Fort Worth after Hurricane Rita and another move back to the Wiergate area resulted in a third move back to Fort Worth after his family's home burned down. Hunt moved back to Newton County to live with his aunt and attended Burkeville High School after his freshman year. He played basketball and football for the Mustangs. Hunt committed to play college football at Louisiana over an offer from Houston.

College career
Hunt redshirted his true freshman season. He was named the Ragin' Cajuns starting left guard after spring practice and started all 13 of the team's games as a redshirt freshman. As a redshirt sophomore, Hunt started 11 games (nine at left guard and two at left tackle) while missing one game due to a suspension. As a redshirt junior Hunt started all 14 of the Ragin' Cajuns games and was named second team All-Sun Belt Conference Hunt only played in seven games as a redshirt senior due to a groin injury but was still named first team All-Sun Belt. He was invited to play in the 2020 Senior Bowl but was unable to participate due to his injury.

Professional career

Hunt was selected by the Miami Dolphins in the second round of the 2020 NFL Draft with the 39th pick. Hunt made his NFL debut on September 13, 2020 in the season opener against the New England Patriots. Hunt made his first career start on October 11, 2020 in a 43-17 victory over the San Francisco 49ers, lining up at right tackle.

References

External links 
 Louisiana Ragin' Cajuns bio

1996 births
Living people
Players of American football from Texas
People from Newton County, Texas
American football offensive guards
American football offensive tackles
Louisiana Ragin' Cajuns football players
Miami Dolphins players